George Sherwin Simonds (March 12, 1874 – November 1, 1938) was a U.S. Army officer with the rank of major general.

Early life 
He was born in Cresco, Iowa on March 12, 1874, the son of son of William O. Simonds and Ellen Sherwin Simonds .

Military career 

He graduated from the United States Military Academy in 1899. After graduation, he was assigned to the 22d Infantry. He served in the Philippines and China. He returned to West Point in 1904 as an instructor in the Department of Law. In addition from 1915 to 1917, he also taught in the Department of Tactics.

When World War I began, he was sent to France as an observer.  After returning to America, he was assigned to the General Staff of the General Headquarters of the American Expeditionary Force and returned to France again in 1917. Lieutenant Colonel George S. Simonds, Infantry, was Chief of Staff of the 2nd Corps, American Expeditionary Force. He received a temporary promotion to colonel in June 1918 and to brigadier general in October 1918. Simonds received the Army Army Distinguished Service Medal for service in the war. The medal's citation reads:

After the war, Simonds graduated from the Army War College in 1920 and was promoted to colonel in July 1921. He was promoted to brigadier general in November 1924.  Simonds commanded the tank center until 1925, and was succeeded by James K. Parsons.

Brigadier General Simonds served as Chief of the War Plans Division of the War Department from September 1, 1927 to September 1, 1931.

In 1932, he was assigned to run the Army War College. Previously he was Douglas MacArthur's chief war planner, and his appointment was made to improve the planning ability in the Army War College.

Simonds was promoted to major general in 1933.

Simonds served as Deputy Chief of Staff in the War Department from February 2, 1935 to May 28, 1936.

In June 1936, Simonds took command of the Fourth United States Army and Ninth Corps; the headquarters was at the Presidio of San Francisco.

Simonds retired from the Army at San Francisco in 1938.

Death and legacy 
He died on November 1, 1938 and was buried in the West Point Cemetery. The ship USAT General George S. Simonds was named for him.

References

External links

1874 births
1938 deaths
People from Cresco, Iowa
United States Military Academy alumni
Military personnel from Iowa
American military personnel of the Philippine–American War
United States Military Academy faculty
United States Army generals of World War I
Recipients of the Distinguished Service Medal (US Army)
United States Army War College alumni
United States Army generals
People from San Francisco
Burials at West Point Cemetery